Miu or MIU may refer to:

People and culture
 Miu (given name)
 Miu (Naga festival)
 Miu language, an Austronesian language spoken in Papua New Guinea
 Ion Miu (born 1955), Romanian virtuoso cimbalom player

Universities
 Al-Mustafa International University, in Qom, Iran
 Maharishi International University, formerly known as Maharishi University of Management
 Manarat International University, in Dhaka, Bangladesh
 Manipal International University, in Malaysia
 Manipur International University, located in Manipur, India
 Marconi International University, Florida; part of Marconi University
 Miami International University of Art & Design, Florida
 Misr International University, an Egyptian private university, Cairo
 Mongolia International University, in Ulaanbaatar, Mongolia
 Myanmar Imperial University, in Yangon, Myanmar

Other
 M.I.U. Album, by the Beach Boys
 Main instrument unit
 Minor injuries unit
 Mobile incinerator unit, a plant for Waste treatment
 Movement for Integration and Unification, an Albanian radical left-wing nationalist movement in Kosovo
 mIU is milli-IU, a thousandth of an international unit
 MU puzzle, also known as the MIU game